Castries is a commune in the Hérault department in southern France.

Population

Twin towns — sister cities
Castries is twinned with Volpiano, Italy since 2010.

Sights
Château de Castries. There is also a stone aqueduct which originally supplied water to the chateau.

See also
Communes of the Hérault department

References

Communes of Hérault